Wan Hapandi bin Wan Nik is a Malaysian politician who currently serves as Deputy of Terengganu State Executive Councillor.

Election Results

References

Malaysian Islamic Party politicians
Members of the Terengganu State Legislative Assembly
Terengganu state executive councillors
21st-century Malaysian politicians
Living people
Year of birth missing (living people)
People from Terengganu
Malaysian people of Malay descent
Malaysian Muslims